Continuity of Operations (COOP) is a United States federal government initiative, required by U.S. Presidential Policy Directive 40 (PPD-40), to ensure that agencies are able to continue performance of essential functions under a broad range of circumstances. PPD-40 specifies certain requirements for continuity plan development, including the requirement that all federal executive branch departments and agencies develop an integrated, overlapping continuity capability, that supports the eight National Essential Functions (NEFs) described in the document.

The Federal Emergency Management Agency provides guidance to the private sector for business continuity planning purposes. A continuity plan is essential to help identify critical functions and develop preventative measures to continue functions should disruption occur.

History 
A Continuity of Operations Plan (or Continuity of Government Plan) has been a part of U.S. government operations since President Dwight D. Eisenhower provided (via executive order) various measures designed to ensure that the government of the United States would be able to continue operating after a nuclear war.

These measures included construction of underground facilities such as "Mount Weather", a putatively nuclear-weapon-proof facility in a hollowed-out mountain in northeastern Virginia; and Raven Rock Mountain Complex near Camp David in Maryland. The public can now tour one such facility, intended to house the entire United States Congress, on the grounds of the Greenbrier Resort in White Sulphur Springs, West Virginia. (See also Project Greek Island.)  Other provisions of the plans included executive orders designating certain government officials to assume Cabinet and other executive-branch positions and carry out the responsibilities of the position if the primary officeholders are killed.

There has been a formal line of succession to the presidency since 1792 (currently found in the Presidential Succession Act of 1947). This runs from the Vice President to the Speaker of the House of Representatives, President pro tempore of the Senate, and then through the Cabinet secretaries in a sequence specified by Congress.

Continuity of government plans are not limited to the federal government.  The majority of states have constitutional provisions that provide for the succession of government in the event of an "enemy attack".

Continuity of Operations plan activated 
The George W. Bush administration put the Continuity of Operations plan into effect for the first time directly following the September 11 attacks. Their implementation involved a rotating staff of 75 to 150 senior officials and other government workers from every federal executive department and other parts of the executive branch in two secure bunkers on the East Coast. Friends, family, and co-workers were only able to reach them through a toll-free number and personal extensions. The Bush administration did not acknowledge the implementation of the COG plan until March 1, 2002.

In 2007, Larry Sabato, a professor at the University of Virginia, criticized the incomplete nature of the plan in his book A More Perfect Constitution. In particular, he objected to the fact that there is no constitutional procedure for replacing U.S. House members in the case of a large-scale disaster which could potentially kill a large number of representatives. In regard to the Continuity of Operations Plan, Sabato said it "failed outright" during the September 11 attacks.

Lack of congressional oversight 

On July 18, 2007, Rep. Peter DeFazio (D-OR), a member of the U.S. House Committee on Homeland Security at that time, requested the classified and more detailed version of the government's continuity-of-operations plan in a letter signed by him and the chairperson of the House Homeland Security Committee, which is supposed to have access to confidential government information.

The president refused to provide the information, to the surprise of the congressional committee. , efforts by the committee to secure a copy of the plan continued.

Documents 

A document named in italics supersedes a previously published document.

The Federal Continuity Directive 1 (FCD 1) is a 2017 directive, released by the Department of Homeland Security (DHS), that provides doctrine and guidance to all federal organizations for developing continuity program plans and capabilities. FCD 1 also serves as guidance to state, local, and tribal governments.

The Federal Continuity Directive 2 (FCD 2) of June 2017 is a directive to assist federal Executive Branch organizations in identifying their Mission Essential Functions (MEFs) and candidate Primary Mission Essential Functions (PMEFs).

The DHS together with the Federal Emergency Management Agency (FEMA), and in coordination with other non-federal partners in July 2013, developed the Continuity Guidance Circular 1 (CGC 1) and CGC 2.

The preamble of the CGC 1 states that its function is to provide "direction to the non-Federal Governments (NFGs) for developing continuity plans and programs. Continuity planning facilitates the performance of essential functions during all-hazards emergencies or other situations that may disrupt normal operations. By continuing the performance of essential functions through a catastrophic emergency, the State, territorial, tribal, and local governments, and the private sector support the ability of the Federal Government to perform National Essential Functions (NEFs)."

CGC 1 parallels the information in FCD 1 closely, but is geared to states, territories, tribal and local governments, and private-sector organizations.

The purpose of Continuity Guidance Circular 2 (CGC 2) is to provide "non-Federal Governments (NFGs) with guidance on how to implement CGC 1, Annex D: ESSENTIAL FUNCTIONS. It provides them with guidance, a methodology, and checklists to identify, assess, and validate their essential functions. This CGC includes guidance for conducting a continuity Business Process Analysis (BPA), Business Impact Analysis (BIA), and a risk assessment that will identify essential function relationships, interdependencies, time sensitivities, threats and vulnerabilities, and mitigation strategies."

Truman administration
 National Security Act of 1947, July 26, 1947

Eisenhower administration
 Eisenhower Ten, March 6, 1958

Carter administration
 Executive Order 12148, "Federal Emergency Management", July 20, 1979

Reagan administration
An unknown contingency plan (which some believe was Rex 84) was publicly mentioned during the Iran-Contra Hearings in 1987. Transcripts from the hearing in the New York Times record the following dialogue between Congressman Jack Brooks, Oliver North's attorney Brendan Sullivan and Senator Daniel Inouye, the Democratic Chair of the Committee:

 , "Assignment of Emergency Preparedness Responsibilities", November 18, 1988
Section 202

The head of each Federal department and agency shall ensure the continuity of essential functions in any national security emergency by providing for: succession to office and emergency delegation of authority in accordance with applicable law; safekeeping of essential resources, facilities, and records; and establishment of emergency operating capabilities.
 , "Assignment of National Security and Emergency Preparedness Telecommunications Functions", April 3, 1984
 NSD 69 NSDD 55, "Enduring National Leadership" September 14, 1982

George H. W. Bush administration
 PDD 67 National Security Directive 69, "Enduring Constitutional Government", June 2, 1992
 FPC 65 Federal Preparedness Circular 61, "Emergency Succession to Key Positions of the Federal Departments and Agencies", August 2, 1991
 FPC 65 Federal Preparedness Circular 62, "Delegation of Authorities for Emergency Situations", August 1, 1991
 Federal Preparedness Circular 60, "Continuity of the Executive Branch of the Federal Government at the Headquarters Level During National Security Emergencies", November 20, 1990
 NSD 69 National Security Directive 37, "Enduring Constitutional Government", April 18, 1990

Clinton administration
 Federal Preparedness Circular 65, "Federal Executive Branch Continuity of Operations (COOP)", July 26, 1999
 "Federal Response Plan" [FEMA 9230.1-PL], April 1999
 Presidential Decision Directive 67, "Enduring Constitutional Government and Continuity of Government Operations", October 21, 1998
 41 Code of Federal Regulations 101-2, "Occupant Emergency Program", revised as of July 1, 1998
 36 Code of Federal Regulations 1236, "Management of Vital Records", revised as of July 1, 1998
 Presidential Decision Directive 63, "Critical Infrastructure Protection (CIP)", May 22, 1998
 Presidential Decision Directive 62, "Protection Against Unconventional Threats to the Homeland and Americans Overseas", May 22, 1998
 FPC 65 Federal Response Planning Guidance 01-94, "Continuity of Operations (COOP)", December 4, 1994

George W. Bush administration
 NSPD 51 National Security Presidential Directive 51, "National Continuity Policy", May 9, 2007 (supersedes Presidential Decision Directive 67) (also known as HSPD 20 "Homeland Security Presidential Directive 20")

Hardware and facilities

The Continuity of Operations Plan involves numerous bunkers, special airplanes, and communication systems.  Much of the information about them is classified; however, information on various systems has been released by the government or described to the public by reporters and writers.  Since many of the details are classified, the public information may be incorrect.  Also they are subject to change without public notice so this list may not reflect current plans.

Facilities

During the Cold War, the United States constructed bunkers to help provide survivability to military command and government officials.  Some have been decommissioned since the Cold War.  The ones that are still considered to be in operation are listed here.

The United States Congress was formerly housed in the Greenbrier Bunker, but since it was discovered in the early 1990s the new location of the Congressional bunker is unknown.
 Cheyenne Mountain Complex - This underground facility is the former home of NORAD.  Becoming fully operational on April 20, 1966, it is located in Colorado Springs, Colorado.  Currently, the military has the goal of placing the operations center on "warm stand-by", meaning that the facility will be maintained and ready for use on short notice as necessary, but not used on a daily basis.  In the event of an emergency deemed serious enough, NORAD and USNORTHCOM would use the bunker for C4ISTAR (command and control) of America's military.
 Site R (Raven Rock) - Near Waynesboro, Pennsylvania, Site R is the emergency home for the Pentagon.  Vice President Cheney is reported to have stayed there after the September 11 attacks.
 Mount Weather - The Mount Weather Emergency Operations Center is a government facility located near Bluemont, Virginia.  It houses operations and training facilities above ground for the Federal Emergency Management Agency (FEMA) and contains an underground facility designed to house key components of the American government in the case of nuclear war.

Airplanes
 Air Force One is the radio call sign of any Air Force plane the President of the United States travels on.  However, the term typically refers to a Boeing VC-25A the president normally uses.  While the VC-25A is equipped with numerous systems to ensure its survival, in an emergency it is recommended that the president use the National Airborne Operations Center.
  National Airborne Operations Center (codenamed Nightwatch) is a Boeing E-4 specially built to serve as a survivable mobile command post for the National Command Authority (NCA).  Either the President or the Secretary of Defense may use it.  It is also possible that the president would authorize the vice president or others to use it, depending on the circumstances.
 Looking Glass is United States Strategic Command's Airborne Command Post, designed to take over in case U.S. Strategic Command is destroyed or incapable of communicating with strategic forces.  Beginning February 3, 1961, an Air Force Looking Glass aircraft was in the air at all times 24 hours a day, 365 days a year.  On July 24, 1990, Looking Glass ceased continuous airborne alert but remained on ground or airborne alert 24 hours a day.  On October 1, 1998, the U.S. Navy replaced the U.S. Air Force in this duty.  In addition, a battle staff now flies with the TACAMO crew.

Ships

Two National Emergency Command Posts Afloat were:
  was converted into Command Ship CC-1 about 1962.
  was converted into Command Ship CC-2 between 1962 and 1963 and included the National Military Command System.

These vessels were decommissioned in 1970.

Communication
The Defense Communication Agency was tasked in 1963 with maintaining an active backup of all communications for any event that could disrupt communications and the management of command and control communications systems as the National Communications System. This mission was partially transferred to Defense Information Systems Agency in charge of supporting command, control, communications, and information systems for the military in the 1990s and would support the National Command Authority. These functions were later transferred to Joint Forces Command and STRATCOM but the backup contingency systems continue to operate. It is assumed that the various bunkers and airplanes have been equipped with special communication equipment to survive a catastrophe.

 Internet - The Internet began as the ARPANET, a program funded by the U.S. military.  The Internet is designed with the capability to withstand losses of large portions of the underlying networks, but was never designed to withstand a nuclear attack. Due to the huge numbers of people using it, it would likely be jammed and unable to handle communication if it suffered a large amount of damage.  During a localized emergency, it is highly useful. However, the loss of electrical power to an area can make accessing the Internet difficult or impossible.
 Communications satellites - Basically immune to any ground catastrophe, it is expected that military communication satellites would provide the government with the ability to communicate in any situation other than one that includes a direct attack upon the satellites.

See also
 Business continuity
 Critical infrastructure protection
 Designated survivor
 Disaster recovery
 National Response Framework
 National Security and Homeland Security Presidential Directive
 Presidential directive
 Presidential Emergency Action Documents

References

External links
 "Disaster Recovery Institute International"
 "Federal Continuity Directive 1 (FCD 1) 2012" - Federal Continuity Directive 1 (FCD 1) 2012, a PDF download of the Directive.
 "Enduring Constitutional Government and Continuity of Government Operations" - Description of the secret Presidential Decision Directive 67, October 21, 1998
 "Federal Executive Branch Continuity of Operations (COOP)" - Federal Preparedness Circular 65, July 26, 1999
 FEDERAL PREPAREDNESS CIRCULAR 65, June 15, 2004 (from  FEMA site)
 National Security and Homeland Security Presidential Directive Subject: National Continuity Policy May 9, 2007 - Revocation. Presidential Decision Directive 67 of October 21, 1998 ("Enduring Constitutional Government and Continuity of Government Operations"), including all Annexes thereto, is hereby revoked.
 "AFI 10-208" USAF Continuity of Operations (COOP) Program
 "The Atomic Midwife: The Eisenhower Administration’s Continuity-of-Government Plans and the Legacy of ‘Constitutional Dictatorship’"
 "Toward Comprehensive Reform of America's Emergency Law Regime & Compendium of National Emergency Powers"

Disaster preparedness in the United States
Federal government of the United States
 
United States national security directives